Chauparan  is a census town in the Chauparan CD block in the Barhi subdivision of the Hazaribagh district in the Indian state of Jharkhand.

Geography

Location

Area overview
Hazaribagh district is a plateau area and forests occupy around about 45% of the total area. It is a predominantly rural area with 92.34% of the population living in rural areas against 7.66% in the urban areas. There are many census towns in the district, as can be seen in the map alongside. Agriculture is the main occupation of the people but with the extension of coal mines, particularly in the southern part of the district, employment in coal mines is increasing. However, it has to be borne in mind that modern mining operations are highly mechanised. Four operational areas of Central Coalfields are marked on the map. All these areas are spread across partly this district and partly the neighbouring districts.

Note: The map alongside presents some of the notable locations in the district. All places marked in the map are linked in the larger full screen map. Urbanisation data calculated on the basis of census data for CD blocks and may vary a little against unpublished official data.

Civic administration

Police station
Chauparan police station serves the Chauparan block.

CD block HQ
The headquarters of Chauparan block are located at Chauparan.

Demographics
According to the 2011 Census of India, Chauparan had a total population of 5,361, of which 2,691 (50%) were males and 2,670 (50%) were females. Population in the age range 0–6 years was 918. The total number of literate persons in Chauparan was 3,428 (77.16% of the population over 6 years).

Infrastructure
According to the District Census Handbook 2011, Hazaribagh, Chauparan covered an area of 4.94 km2. Among the civic amenities, it had 47 km roads with open drains, the protected water supply involved hand pumps, uncovered wells. It had 645 domestic electric connections, 26 road light points.  Among the educational facilities it had 3 primary schools, 2 middle schools, 2 secondary schools, 2 senior secondary schools. It had the branch offices of 1 nationalised bank, 1 cooperative bank, 1 agricultural credit society.

Transport
Chauparan is on National Highway 19 (old number: NH 2/ Grand Trunk Road). A road links it to Itkhori and Chatra.

Education
Shahid Bhagat Singh +2 School Jhapa Bisanpur, Shishu Vidya Mandir Dadpur
Munam Public School & Surekha Prakashbhai Public School which are affiliated to CBSE.
K.B.S.S +2 school affiliated to Jharkhand Academic Council. Sundarlal Jain High School Singhrawan, Chauparan  affiliated  to  Jharkhand Academic Council  Ranchi. Chauparan Inter College affiliated to Jharkhand Academic council.

References

Cities and towns in Hazaribagh district